Lozovskoye is a rural locality in Katyrinsky Selsoviet Rural Settlement, Oktyabrsky District, Kursk Oblast, Russia. Population:

Geography 
The village is located on the Seym River (a left tributary of the Desna), 66 km from the Russia–Ukraine border, 23 km south-west of Kursk, 7 km west of the district center – the urban-type settlement Pryamitsyno, at the western border of the selsoviet center – Mitrofanova.

 Climate
Lozovskoye has a warm-summer humid continental climate (Dfb in the Köppen climate classification).

Transport 
Lozovskoye is located 17.5 km from the federal route  Crimea Highway (a part of the European route ), on the road of regional importance  (Kursk – Lgov – Rylsk – border with Ukraine), 2 km from the nearest railway halt 439 km (railway line Lgov I — Kursk).

The rural locality is situated 34.5 km from Kursk Vostochny Airport, 123 km from Belgorod International Airport and 236 km from Voronezh Peter the Great Airport.

References

Notes

Sources

Rural localities in Oktyabrsky District, Kursk Oblast